Marasmiellus is a genus of fungi in the family Omphalotaceae (synonym to Marasmiaceae). The widespread genus, circumscribed by American mycologist William Murrill in 1915, contains over 250 species.
The name comes from the Greek marasmus meaning wasting.

Morphology and life cycle 
The morphology of Marasmiellus has received little attention compared to other genera of Omphalotaceae, mainly due to their uncolorful pileus, small basidiocarps, and little variation in morphological characters. These factors complicate delimitations of species within this genus. Species of Marasmiellus have prostrate and diverticulate hyphae, which have no clear orientation. However, it has been observed that outher hyphae can aggregate in fascicles and be radially oriented. Furthermore, cheilocystidia arise from horizontal hyphae and are frequently embedded in the hymenium, often being prostrate. Some species of Marasmiellus use basidiospore germination, and distuiguishing different genera based on reproduction would depend on the speed of germination. During germination spores of Marasmiellus tend to disperse in dilution platings. Some species are tetrapolar. Additionally, no bipolar or amphithallic taxa in this genus have been reported, which is unexpected, as this mating behavior is common for tropical agarics, by allowing rapid colonizations. Their basidiocarps are collybioid or omphalioid and they have a white spore print. The cutis consis of a pileipellis, which sometimes transitions into a trichoderm, either with or without Rameales-structure.

Ecology 
Species of Marasmiellus are distributed around tropical and sub-tropical forested areas around the world, where they play a significant ecological role by being saprotrophic, degrading leafy and woody remains. Some species are parasitic and attack certain plants that are economically important, such as sugar cane, maize, bananas, and coconut palms. Observations of rhizomorph-forming species of Marasmiellus have also been confirmed (e.g Marasmiellus tenerrimus var setulosu and Marasmiellus opacu).

Taxonomy 

Marasmiellus only represented three species when it was first described by William Murrill (Marasmiellus inconspicuous Murrill (Cuba), Marasmiellus purpureus (Berk. & Curt.) Murrill (Cuba), and Marasmiellus juniperinus Murrill (Jamaica)). Currently the genera consists of more than 250 species, of which the type species, M. juniperinus, remains the same as when the genera was first described. Marasmiellus was traditionally included in Tricholomataceae R. Heim ex Pouzar, but later DNA studies showed that parts of the genus belong to Omphalotaceae, which was described by A. Bresinsky in 1985 and is considered a synomyn to Marasmiaceae. Furthermore, several studies show that the Marasmiellus branched as multiple polyphyletic and artificial groups. This has led to conflict surrounding its position relative to Gymnopus, and has resulted in two opposing views regarding their taxonomy: 1) Marasmiellus is encompassed within Gymnopus (inclusive), or 2) Marasmiellus remains a distinct genus from Gymnopus (restrictive). The most recent studies have shown that the second hypothesis is the strongest, placing Marasmiellus as a separate genus, but more research is required to confirm this.

Species

Marasmiellus afer
Marasmiellus affixus
Marasmiellus albiceps
Marasmiellus albifolius
Marasmiellus albobrunnescens
Marasmiellus albofuscus
Marasmiellus alliiodorus
Marasmiellus alneus
Marasmiellus alvaradoi
Marasmiellus amazoniensis
Marasmiellus ambiguus
Marasmiellus amphicystis
Marasmiellus amygdalosporus
Marasmiellus anastomosus
Marasmiellus androsaceiformis
Marasmiellus angustispermus
Marasmiellus anomalus
Marasmiellus antarcticus
Marasmiellus anthocephalus
Marasmiellus aporposeptus
Marasmiellus appalachianus
Marasmiellus aquilus
Marasmiellus atropapillatus
Marasmiellus atrosetosus
Marasmiellus atrostipitatus
Marasmiellus aurantiorufescens
Marasmiellus baeosporoides
Marasmiellus baeosporus
Marasmiellus bambusicola
Marasmiellus bauhiniae
Marasmiellus berkeleyi
Marasmiellus bermudensis
Marasmiellus bisporiger
Marasmiellus bolivarianus
Marasmiellus bonaerensis
Marasmiellus bonii
Marasmiellus brevisporus
Marasmiellus brunneocarpus
Marasmiellus brunneomarginatus
Marasmiellus caatingensis
Marasmiellus caesioater
Marasmiellus caespitosus
Marasmiellus calami
Marasmiellus californicus
Marasmiellus candidus
Marasmiellus caracasensis
Marasmiellus carneopallidus
Marasmiellus castaneidiscus
Marasmiellus catephes
Marasmiellus celebanticus
Marasmiellus chamaecyparidis
Marasmiellus chilensis
Marasmiellus cinchonensis
Marasmiellus cinereus
Marasmiellus clitocybe
Marasmiellus clusilis
Marasmiellus cnacopolius
Marasmiellus cocophilus
Marasmiellus cocosensis
Marasmiellus coilobasis
Marasmiellus colocasiae
Marasmiellus columbianus
Marasmiellus confertifolius
Marasmiellus contrarius
Marasmiellus corsicus
Marasmiellus corticigenus
Marasmiellus corticum
Marasmiellus corynophloeus
Marasmiellus couleu
Marasmiellus crassitunicatus
Marasmiellus crinipelloides
Marasmiellus cubensis
Marasmiellus cupreovirens
Marasmiellus curtipes
Marasmiellus cystidiosus
Marasmiellus daguae
Marasmiellus dealbatus
Marasmiellus defibulatus
Marasmiellus delicius
Marasmiellus delilei
Marasmiellus dendroegrus
Marasmiellus devenulatus
Marasmiellus distantifolius
Marasmiellus dryogeton
Marasmiellus dunensis
Marasmiellus earlei
Marasmiellus eburneus
Marasmiellus echinocephalus
Marasmiellus elongatisporus
Marasmiellus enodis
Marasmiellus epibryus
Marasmiellus epitrichialis
Marasmiellus epochnous
Marasmiellus eugeniae
Marasmiellus filocystis
Marasmiellus filopes
Marasmiellus flaccidus
Marasmiellus flosculus
Marasmiellus foliicola
Marasmiellus foliorum
Marasmiellus fusicystis
Marasmiellus gigantosporus
Marasmiellus gilvus
Marasmiellus gomez-pompae
Marasmiellus goossensiae
Marasmiellus gossypinulus
Marasmiellus graminis
Marasmiellus gregarius
Marasmiellus guadelupensis
Marasmiellus guatopoensis
Marasmiellus guzmanii
Marasmiellus hapuuarum
Marasmiellus helminthocystis
Marasmiellus hirtellus
Marasmiellus hondurensis
Marasmiellus humillimus
Marasmiellus hypolissus
Marasmiellus idroboi
Marasmiellus ignobilis
Marasmiellus iguazuensis
Marasmiellus illinorum
Marasmiellus incarnatipallens
Marasmiellus inconspicuus
Marasmiellus incrustatus
Marasmiellus inoderma
Marasmiellus inodermatoides
Marasmiellus juniperinus
Marasmiellus junquitoensis
Marasmiellus keralensis
Marasmiellus kindyerracola
Marasmiellus koreanus
Marasmiellus laschiopsis
Marasmiellus lassei
Marasmiellus lateralis
Marasmiellus latispermus
Marasmiellus laurifoliae
Marasmiellus lecythidacearum
Marasmiellus leiophyllus
Marasmiellus leptophyllus
Marasmiellus leucophyllus
Marasmiellus luteus
Marasmiellus lysochlorus
Marasmiellus maas-geesterani
Marasmiellus mariluanensis
Marasmiellus maritimus
Marasmiellus martynii
Marasmiellus merulius
Marasmiellus mesosporus
Marasmiellus microscopicus
Marasmiellus milicae
Marasmiellus minutalis
Marasmiellus minutus
Marasmiellus misionensis
Marasmiellus musacearum
Marasmiellus nanus
Marasmiellus napoensis
Marasmiellus nivosus
Marasmiellus nodosus
Marasmiellus nothofagineus
Marasmiellus nubigenus
Marasmiellus oblongisporus
Marasmiellus oligocinsulae
Marasmiellus omphaloides
Marasmiellus omphalophorus
Marasmiellus orinocensis
Marasmiellus osmophorus
Marasmiellus osornensis
Marasmiellus pachycraspedum
Marasmiellus pacificus
Marasmiellus paludosus
Marasmiellus panamensis
Marasmiellus pandoensis
Marasmiellus pantholocystis
Marasmiellus papillatomarginatus
Marasmiellus papillatus
Marasmiellus papillifer
Marasmiellus paraensis
Marasmiellus paralacteus
Marasmiellus parlatorei
Marasmiellus paspali
Marasmiellus patouillardii
Marasmiellus peckii
Marasmiellus perangustispermnus
Marasmiellus pernambucensis
Marasmiellus petchii
Marasmiellus petiolicola
Marasmiellus petiolorum
Marasmiellus peullensis
Marasmiellus phaeomarasmioides
Marasmiellus phaeophyllus
Marasmiellus picipes
Marasmiellus pilosus
Marasmiellus platyhyphes
Marasmiellus pluvius
Marasmiellus polyphyllus
Marasmiellus potamogeton
Marasmiellus potassiovirens
Marasmiellus praeacutus
Marasmiellus primulae
Marasmiellus primulinus
Marasmiellus pruinosulus
Marasmiellus pseudogracilis
Marasmiellus pseudoparaphysatus
Marasmiellus pseudoramealis
Marasmiellus pulchellus
Marasmiellus pusillimus
Marasmiellus pygmaeus
Marasmiellus quercinus
Marasmiellus radiatim-plicatus
Marasmiellus ramealis
Marasmiellus ramorum
Marasmiellus rawakensis
Marasmiellus rhizomorphogenus
Marasmiellus rhodophyllus
Marasmiellus riberaltensis
Marasmiellus rosascentifolius
Marasmiellus roseipallens
Marasmiellus roseotinctus
Marasmiellus rubellus
Marasmiellus rugulosus
Marasmiellus saccharophilus
Marasmiellus salmonicolor
Marasmiellus sanctae-marthae
Marasmiellus scandens
Marasmiellus schiffneri
Marasmiellus segregabilis
Marasmiellus senescens
Marasmiellus sinensis
Marasmiellus sotae
Marasmiellus sphaerosporus
Marasmiellus sprucei
Marasmiellus stenocystis
Marasmiellus stenophylloides
Marasmiellus stenosporus
Marasmiellus stratosus
Marasmiellus stypinoides
Marasmiellus stypinus
Marasmiellus subaurantiacus
Marasmiellus subcoracinus
Marasmiellus subdealbatus
Marasmiellus subepiphyllus
Marasmiellus subfumosus
Marasmiellus subgraminis
Marasmiellus subhirtellus
Marasmiellus subingratus
Marasmiellus subinodermatoides
Marasmiellus subnigricans
Marasmiellus subochraceus
Marasmiellus subolivaceomelleus
Marasmiellus subpumilus
Marasmiellus subramealis
Marasmiellus synodicus
Marasmiellus tener
Marasmiellus tenerrimus
Marasmiellus tetrachrous
Marasmiellus thaxteri
Marasmiellus trabutii
Marasmiellus trichodermialis
Marasmiellus tricolor
Marasmiellus tropicalis
Marasmiellus troyanus
Marasmiellus ugandensis
Marasmiellus umbilicatus
Marasmiellus umbonifer
Marasmiellus usambarensis
Marasmiellus vaillantii
Marasmiellus varzeae
Marasmiellus vernalis
Marasmiellus vinosus
Marasmiellus violaceogriseus
Marasmiellus violae
Marasmiellus virgatocutis
Marasmiellus viridifuscus
Marasmiellus volvatus
Marasmiellus xerophyticus
Marasmiellus yalae

See also
List of Marasmiaceae genera

References

Marasmiaceae
Agaricales genera
Taxa named by William Alphonso Murrill